Iijoki is a river of Finland in the region of North Ostrobothnia. The river has many tributaries. It flows for  into the Gulf of Bothnia. Some of its main tributaries are Siuruanjoki and Livojoki. It has about 150 rapids.

See also
List of rivers in Finland

References

Further reading
Kalle Päätalo has written a 26 part novel; Juuret Iijoen törmässä.

External links

Rivers of Finland
 
Landforms of North Ostrobothnia
Taivalkoski
Ii
Rivers of Kuusamo
Rivers of Pudasjärvi
Rivers of Oulu